Hazelmere or similar names may refer to:

Places
 Haslemere, Surrey, England, a town
 Haslemere (UK Parliament constituency)
 Haslemere Educational Museum
 Haslemere railway station, Surrey, England 
 Hazelmere, Western Australia, a suburb of Perth
 Hazelmere, Alberta, Canada, an unincorporated locality
 Hazlemere, Buckinghamshire, England, a village

Other
 Haselmere (surname), with a list of people of this name 
 Haslemere Group, anti-poverty advocates 
 Hazelmere Dam, Kwazulu Natal, South Africa, a dam